The 1993 Oceania Youth Athletics Championships were held in Canberra, Australia, between March 15–16, 1993. The host country Australia did not send athletes. 
A total of 29 events were contested, 15 by boys and 14 by girls.

Medal summary
Complete results can be found on the Athletics Weekly, and on the World Junior Athletics History webpages.

Boys under 18 (Youth)

Girls under 18 (Youth)

Medal table (unofficial)

Participation (unofficial)
An unofficial count yields the number of about 96 athletes from 13 countries.
There were no athletes from host country Australia.

 (8)
 (7)
 (16)
 (6)
 (5)
 (10)
 (7)
 (2)
 (8)
 (6)
 (7)
/ (7)
 (7)

References

Oceania Youth Athletics Championships
International athletics competitions hosted by Australia
Oceanian U18 Championships
1993 in Australian sport
Youth sport in Australia
1993 in youth sport
March 1993 sports events in Australia